The 2nd Edda Awards were held on 19 November 2000 at the National Theatre of Iceland. The awards were hosted by actress Steinunn Ólína Þorsteinsdóttir and TV presenter Jón Ársæll Þórðarson. The awards were broadcast live on RÚV.

The public could cast their vote online on the Icelandic news website Morgunblaðið. Public votes had 30% say in the results, and the academy the other 70%. The public was also able to vote for "Best Television Personality" and their vote had 100% say in the result.

The film Angels of the Universe (Englar alheimsins), based on the novel by Einar Már Guðmundsson, received most nominations. It received eight nominations and won seven awards.

Ratings 
A Gallup poll took place on request from The Icelandic Film and Television Academy. The result showed that 65% of the Icelandic people tuned in to watch the live broadcast and 86% of those asked were satisfied with the show.

New Categories 
 Edda Award for Best Supporting Actor
 Edda Award for Best Supporting Actress
 Edda Award for Best Television Personality

Results 
The nominees and winners were:

Honorary Award:
 Þorgeir Þorgeirson, filmmaker, author and translator
ÍKSA Professional Awards:
 Kjartan Kjartansson,'' for sound design in Englar alheimsins, 101 Reykjavík, Fíaskó and Myrkrahöfðinginn
 Baltasar Kormákur - screenplay in 101 Reykjavík
 Sigur Rós and Hilmar Örn Hilmarsson for music í Englar alheimsins

External links 
 Edda Awards official website

References 

Edda Awards
2000 film awards